"Break It to Me Gently" is a song by American singer Aretha Franklin, released in 1977 as the first single from her album, Sweet Passion. The track was written and produced by Carole Bayer Sager and Marvin Hamlisch which was an R&B hit for Franklin, it reached number one on Billboard's Hot Soul Singles chart in June 1977.

The song's success was only faintly reflected on the Billboard Hot 100 with a Number 85 peak, before dropping out of the Hot 100 after two weeks. "Break It to Me Gently" would be Franklin's final Atlantic single to appear on the Hot 100 - from which she would be absent until 1980.

Track listing 
US, UK 7" Vinyl single
A1. "Break It to Me Gently" – 3:19
B1. "Meadows of Springtime" – 5:34

Personnel and credits
Performers
 Aretha Franklin – vocals
 Joe Clayton – congas
 Harold Mason – drums
 David Paich – keyboards
 Ray Parker Jr. – guitar
 Chuck Rainey – bass guitar
 Lee Ritenour – guitar
 Sylvester Rivers – keyboards

Production
 Producers – Marvin Hamlisch and Carole Bayer-Sager.
 Co-Producers – David Paich and Marty Paich.
 Engineers – Frank Kemjar.
 Mixed at Studio 55 (Los Angeles, CA).

Charts

References

1977 singles
Aretha Franklin songs
Songs written by Carole Bayer Sager
Songs written by Marvin Hamlisch
1977 songs

Atlantic Records singles